Eucosma striatulana is a species of moth of the family Tortricidae. It is found in China (Hubei) and Japan.

References

Moths described in 1900
Eucosmini